Aussiecon is the name of several World Science Fiction Conventions held in Melbourne, Australia:

 The 33rd World Science Fiction Convention, known as Aussiecon, or retrospectively as Aussiecon I, was held in 1975
 The 43rd World Science Fiction Convention, known as Aussiecon Two, was held in 1985
 The 57th World Science Fiction Convention, known as Aussiecon Three, was held in 1999
 The 68th World Science Fiction Convention, known as Aussiecon Four, was held in 2010